Seyyed Lefteh Ahmad-Nejad (born in Khorramshahr) is the Principlist representative of Khorramshahr people in the Islamic Consultative Assembly (the Parliament of Iran) who was elected at the 11th Majles elections on 21 February 2020 and gained about 10,000 votes.

Ahmad-Nejad who is originally from Khuzestani-Arabs (Iranian Arabs), has college education at the subject of (Master of) "Business-Administration"; amongst his work experiences are as follows: a member of economic-commission in the "Islamic Consultative Assembly", and a person in charge of "rural-cooperative".

See also
 Seyyed Mohammad Molavi
 Jalil Mokhtar
 Seyyed Mojtaba Mahfouzi
 Habib Aghajari
 Qasem Saedi

References

Members of the Islamic Consultative Assembly by term
Members of the 11th Islamic Consultative Assembly
People from Khorramshahr
Living people
Iranian Arab politicians
Year of birth missing (living people)